Association football has been played in Albania for over century and is today one of the country's most popular sports. Domestic clubs and a national championship, along with a national team, were established in the 1920s and 1930s. Since the second half of the 20th century, Albania has been a key component of European football.

Early developments 
Christian missionaries, from countries where football was already widespread, were witnessed playing football whilst visiting the city of Shkodër in the early 20th century. The game proved popular with the locals and quickly spread throughout the country. Vllaznia was the first football club to be established in 1920, and on 6 June 1930 the Football Association of Albania (FSHF) was founded.

International 
Following its creation, the FSHF gained FIFA affiliation in 1932. The Albania national team did not play its first international match until 14 years later, when they defeated Montenegro 5-0 on 22 September 1946. In October 1946 Albania hosted the Balkan Nations' Cup for the first time. They lost the first match to Yugoslavia but ultimately went on to win the competition. In 1954 the FSHF was a founding member of UEFA, and the national team has competed in several UEFA Championships.

1946: Champion of the Balkans

The early years oversaw a notably successful Balkan Cup in the 1946 campaign. Albania won the cup after overcoming Yugoslavia on level points but a better goal difference. The final match ended in a 1–0 win against Romania. Four days earlier, Albania had already beaten Bulgaria 3–1. Albania wasn't expected to participate, but the withdrawal of Greece from the tournament offered Albania a chance to join in the re-established post-war cup.

Uefa Euro 1964 being between the best 16 Teams in Europe 

In 1964 Albania competed in a Euro Cup competition and the only time Albania was between the best 16 teams of the continent, due to the matches against Greece being forfeited and Albania given walkover. In the Round of 16 Albania lost 4–0 to Denmark in the first leg, and while they won the second 1–0, they couldn't pass to the quarterfinals. Albania finished this Tournament at the 9th Rank. This was the greatest success as the Albania National Team in their history. At the end of the tournament Albania ranked 9th in Europe. Albania won three of their 4 Matches in fact. Having the best Campaign followed for the UEFA Euro 2016 Qualifications, were they won four Matches and also one in the Groupstages as well were they beat Romania with 0-1 in Lens.

1986 World Cup Dream for Albania in Mexico
Nearly Qualified for the World Cup in Mexico 1986  

      
1986 FIFA World Cup qualification – UEFA Group 1/
In a 4-team group, Albania got 4 points with one win and 2 draws. After losing to Belgium in Brussels, Albania were visitors in eventual group winners Poland. There, Albania got its first point in a shocking 2–2 draw. Less than two months later, Albania was host to group runners-up Belgium in Tirana, defeating them with a surprising 2–0 win. After losing to Greece away and Poland at home, Albania got its last point in its last game against neighbour rivals Greece in a 1–1 draw finishing the Group in the third Place respectively. Just 4 points away from the First place. If they won against Poland away from Home Albania were in the World Cup-Playoffs. It was their closes try to Qualify for an World Cup at that time.

2014–16: Success at the European Championship

The qualifying draw took place on 23 February 2014. Albania was drawn in Group I along with Portugal, Denmark, Serbia, and Armenia. Qualifying matches started in September 2014. Albania started the qualifiers with a historic result as they beat group favourites Portugal 1–0 away thanks to a goal from Bekim Balaj. In the second match against Denmark at the newly renovated Elbasan Arena, Albania was on lead until the 82nd minute where Lasse Vibe equalized, with the match ending 1–1. In the next game against Serbia at Partizan Stadium, the match was abandoned in 42nd minute after several on and off the field incidents. Despite the violence by Serbia's hooligans against Albania at Partizan Stadium, Serbia was awarded the 3–0 victory after the decision by UEFA. The decision was appealed by both Serbia and Albania, but the decision was upheld by UEFA. Both associations then filed further appeals to the Court of Arbitration for Sport, and on 10 July 2015 the Court of Arbitration for Sport rejected the appeal filed by the Serbian FA, and upholds in part the appeal filed by the Albanian FA, meaning the match is deemed to have been forfeited by Serbia with 0–3 and they are still deducted three points.

In the fourth match against Armenia at home, Albania were behind from the 4th minute after an own goal from Mërgim Mavraj, but Mavraj equalized in the 77th minute with a powerful header. Four minutes later Shkëlzen Gashi  scored the winner, putting Albania in the 2nd position along with Denmark with 10 points. It was the first time that Albania ended the first part of the qualifiers in the second spot. Albania made history again by beating one-time world champions and UEFA Euro 2016 hosts France at the Elbasan Arena in the "Group I" friendly match. After a draw against Denmark, Albania clinched at least a play-off place. Despite losing to Portugal and Serbia, Albania defeated Armenia 3–0 in Yerevan and qualified for UEFA Euro 2016, its second ever appearance at a major men's football tournament. For this achievement the entire team was bestowed the Honor of Nation Order by Albania's President Bujar Nishani. In addition to the qualification, Albania achieved a world record in terms of not conceding any away goals during the tournament, while scoring seven away goals.

After the Serbia–Albania match, the national team of Albania was given awards of honor and city recognition by the cities of Tirana, Vlore, Kamëz, and Bajram Curri for protecting the national symbols.

Albania lost 0–1 to Switzerland and 0–2 to hosts France. While they beat Romania 1–0 (their first win against Romania since 1947), the team finished last among the third-placed teams and didn't progress beyond the group stage.

Honours

 Winners of VIII Balkan Cup (Tirana, October 1946)
 Winners of Rothmans Football International Tournament: 2000 (VIII) (Valletta, 4 February — 10 February 2000)

UEFA Nations League:

League C:

 Winners: 2020

The Honours of the Albanian youth Teams 
The youth of Albania had some big success itself.  
 The Under 21 National Team of Albania 
Quarterfinalists for the Under 21 UEFA Euros in 1984.
Winning two back to back Balkan Youth Championships in 
1978 and 1981 beating Romania and Bulgaria in the Finals Ranked 6th in the U21 UEFA Euros Championships in 1984.
Soccer Magazine voted the Under 21 as the 8th best Team in 1983 as the 8th best Team in the World.

The Under 18 National Team

Groupstage for the UEFA U18 Euros in 1982 

The Under 17 National Team

Groupestage for the UEFA U17 Euros in 1994

Balkan Youth Championship 

Albania Under-21 participated in the Balkan Youth Championship as a succeeder of Under-23 team, in the 1976–78 and 1981 competitions, winning both with finals against Romania and Bulgaria. Notably in 1978, the second leg of the final match against Romania was characterized by a large Albania's win 7–1, which is the largest win ever recorded by Albania U-21.

1984 UEFA European Under-21 Football Championship

Albania Under-21s have managed to qualify only once in their history, and that came in the year of 1984 when they managed to qualify for the 1984 UEFA European Under-21 Football Championship, although they were competing for the first time in such tournament. They were drawn in a very tough group which included the West Germany, Turkey and Austria. The historic event was the first time any Albanian squad qualified for a Europe or World Championship, and is only the fifth time any Albanian squad qualified for the major championships. To this day the team that qualified for 1984 UEFA European Under-21 Football Championship are still regarded as the most successful team in Albanian football history. Albania U21 managed to qualify without losing a single game Winning four Matches in this Group and managing two very good draws against one of the biggest and best footballing nations, West Germany. 

Albania played the quarter finals against Italy, against which it lost twice 0–1, and 0–1, in Albania and Italy respectively. Italy advanced to the semifinals of Euro '84 and lost them against England, eventual champions of the tournament.

The under 21 was voted by the English Football Magazine Soccer in 1983 as the 8th best team in the world.

Domestic football 
A national championship was established for the first time in 1930 and was contested by six teams. SK Tirana were the first champions and remain one of the country's most significant clubs today.

The first Albanian club to participate in European football was Partizani Tirana, which took Albania's European Cup spot in 1960. Albanian participation in European competition was erratic through the country's communist era, with regular politically-motivated withdrawals from matches by Albanian clubs often leading to lengthy bans from UEFA. However, despite these teething problems Albanian teams continued to appear sporadically in the European Cup. 

The biggest Domestic Football Success came in the 80s were the Albanian Club reach plenty of times the Round of 16 in UEFA Competitions.

1982-83 KF Tiranas Golden 80's in Europe 
KF Tirana Qualified for the first time in the Round of 16 in the European cup in 1982-83 after beating Linfield after winning the first round with 1-0 from Augustin Kola in the 74 they lost the second leg but won on away goals. In the Round of 16 they withdrew against Dynamo Kiev due to political reasons at that time. But they achieve the same feat in 1988/89 and 1989/90 beating Hamrun Spartans and Silema Wanderes with 3-2 and 5-1. They lost in 1988-89 with 0-4 against IFK Göteborg and Bayern Munich with 6-1 on aggregate! This ranked KF Tirana as the 31st best football team in the world.

They also qualified for the Uefa Cup Winners Round of 16 in 1986-87 after beating an strong Opponent in the First Round in the name of Dynamo Bukarest, in both games with 1-0 and 2-1 away. However, they lost in the Round of 16 against Malmo FF with 0-3 at home but getting an respectful draw away from home with a 0-0 in Malmo

Recently, KF Tirana reached the Uefa Europa League playoffs in 2020-21, losing in the match against Young Boys Bern with 3-0.

1987-88 Flamutari Vlora's Prime time 
KF Flamutari Vlora made a big success of reaching the Round of 16 just in their second attempt. In the first Round they beat Partizan Beograd with 2-0 and 1-2 aggregate 3-2 in the first match they won deserved against Beograd scoring two late goals one from Iljadhi and a own goal from Djordevic earlier before. In the second leg KF Flamutari faced a hard charge from 0-2 behind but Sokol Kushta scored late in the game an stunning Goal securing them the Important away Goal to go through in the next Round. In the second Round Flamutari Vlora beating the East German team Wismut aue after a 1-0 loss away with 2:0 in the second leg with goals from Tuci and Vasil Ruci.

In the Round of 16 they faced the giants from Spain Fc Barcelona last time they beat them nearly at home with 1-0 but lost the time after an draw just minutes before the match ended. In 1986-87 but on this time it wouldn't be that close in the first leg of the RD 16 Flamutari Vlora lost 4-1 and their hopes were dashed after that game. 

But in the second leg they still beat Barcelona with a beautiful goal from Sokol Kushta in the 4th Minute they had plenty of good chances to score and to bring the gap down but they didn't score from it.

2015–16 
They kicked off the 2015–16 campaign with their biggest ever Champions League and European win, as they defeated Northern Ireland side Crusaders 4–1. They lost the away match 2–3, but qualified to the third qualifying round for the second time with an aggregate 6–4 score and they faced Milsami Orhei. They beat Milsami 2–0 both home and away to become the only Albanian side to qualify to the UEFA Champions League play-offs, where they met Dinamo Zagreb. They were defeated 1–2 at home and 1–4 away and eliminated from Champions League. They were dropped into the UEFA Europa League group stages, becoming the first Albanian club to progress to the group stage of a European competition. Skënderbeu Korçë were drawn against Beşiktaş, Lokomotiv Moscow and Sporting Clube de Portugal. In matchday 1, their first ever group stage game, the club was defeated at home 0–1 by Beşiktaş after a hard fight between the two sides. In the next matchday, they lost 0–2 to Lokomotiv Moscow in Moscow. Their worst defeat in the European competition yet came the next matchday, a storming 1–5 loss to Sporting in the away leg at Lisbon, but also had the Albanian side scoring their first goal in the UEFA Europa League group stages. In the home match, Skënderbeu Korçë recorded a historic 3–0 win over Sporting, was one of the most important victories of a football club in Albania as Skënderbeu recorded their first points in a Europa League group stage game.

2017-18  
Skënderbeu entered Europa League, as they finished third in Albanian Superliga. They played against UE Sant Julia, defeating them 1–0 at home and 5–0 in Andorra, so they qualified. For the 2nd round, they played against the Kazakhstan outfit, Kairat. The match ended in a draw (1–1) in Kazakhstan and won 2–0 at home. They then went on to play the Czech Republic side, FK Mladá Boleslav and lost 2–1 on the night in the Czech Republic. The return match in Elbasan Arena saw Skënderbeu winning the regular time 2–1, while the extra periods yielded no further goals. Skënderbeu ultimately triumphed 4–2 on penalties. For the play-off round, they were drawn against Dinamo Zagreb for their second time, just like the UEFA Champions League play-off 2 years ago, where Skënderbeu were eliminated 6–2 on aggregate. They surprised Dinamo in the away match by scoring through Liridon Latifi in the 37th minute, but conceding in the very last minute. Even though Skënderbeu didn't win, they could hope for the Europa League qualification thanks to the away goal scored. Skënderbeu needed at least a goalless draw to progress to the next stage of the competition. In the return leg, that was exactly what happened. Skënderbeu qualified for the group stage for the second time in their history, and also being the first Albanian team to win four qualifying rounds in the Europa League. Also, they have been the only Albanian club to earn more than 3 points, which was the record for the most points earned in the Europa League group stage by an Albanian club 2 years ago.

And following the fall of communism in Albania the country's teams featured more regularly in European football. UEFA support was a crucial factor in enabling Albanian football to develop from 1991 onwards, as the country transitioned to democracy.

References

 
Football in Albania